Omar Hernandez Chavarria (born May 4, 2001) is an American college soccer player who currently plays for Wake Forest University. He had previously played for the academy teams of Chattanooga FC and Atlanta United FC.

Hernandez was the 2019 recipient of Gatorade Player of the Year award for boys' soccer. The award is a nationally recognized honor given to the best high school athlete in the United States.

Career

Youth and college 
Hernandez was listed as a three-star recruit by Top Drawer Soccer, and ultimately signed a National Letter of Intent with Wake Forest University in April 2018, ahead of his senior year. Hernandez rejected offers to play for South Carolina, SMU, UCF, South Florida, East Tennessee State, and High Point.

During his senior year of high school, Hernandez transferred from the Chattanooga FC Academy to the Atlanta United FC Academy. In high school soccer, Hernandez captained the team to a 23-0-0 record and to the Georgia State 6A Boys' Soccer Championship, as well as the #1 high school ranking in the nation by USA Today. On June 11, 2019, he received the Gatorade Player of the Year for boys' soccer for being recognized as the best boy's high school soccer player in the United States.

On August 30, 2019, Hernandez made his collegiate debut for Wake Forest, playing 17 minutes in a 2–1 victory against UCF. Hernandez made his first assist for Wake Forest on September 6, 2019, in a 3–1 win against Dartmouth, three days before his first start for Wake Forest, in a 4–0 win against Houston Baptist.

Senior 
During the 2019 USL League Two season, Hernandez played with the Dalton Red Wolves, the reserve team of Chattanooga Red Wolves. He appeared six matches, scoring one goal.

References

External links 
 Omar Hernandez at USL League Two
 Omar Hernandez at Wake Forest Athletics

2001 births
Living people
American people of Mexican descent
Association football midfielders
People from Dalton, Georgia
People from Whitfield County, Georgia
Soccer players from Georgia (U.S. state)
USL League Two players
Wake Forest Demon Deacons men's soccer players
American soccer players
Chattanooga FC players